Mata Taua Peak is a peak,  high, on the ridge separating the mouth of Matataua Glacier and Ferrigno Glacier in the Royal Society Range, Victoria Land, Antarctica. It was named by the New Zealand Geographic Board in 1994 in reference to the view from this peak, "Mata Taua" being a Māori name meaning "a scout before the troops". To the northeast, there is an array of rocky peaks; to the southwest, the view overlooks Rampart Ridge and the large Upper Staircase glacier.

References

Mountains of Victoria Land
Scott Coast